It Came from the Sea is a DJ mix album, mixed by Bonobo, released as part of the Solid Steel DJ mix series for Ninja Tune.

Track listing

References

Bonobo (musician) compilation albums
DJ mix albums
2005 compilation albums
Ninja Tune compilation albums